Brama pauciradiata is a species of pomfret native to Australia and the Coral Sea.

References 

Animals described in 1995
pauciradiata